Christoffel Brand may refer to:

 Christoffel Brand (1797–1875), South African jurist, politician, statesman and first Speaker of the Legislative Assembly of the Cape Colony
 Christoffel Brand (trader) (1738–1815), South African trader and host at Simon's Town